Čelebić is a Serbo-Croatian surname, derived from Turkish çelebi meaning "gentleman". Notable people with the surname include:

Gojko Čelebić (born 1958), Montenegrin writer and diplomat
Nikola Čelebić (born 1989), Montenegrin footballer
Ljubomir Čelebić (born 1991), Montenegrin tennis player
Sead Čelebić (born 1956), former Bosnian footballer

See also 
 Celebic (disambiguation)
 Čelebići (disambiguation)

Bosnian surnames
Montenegrin surnames
Patronymic surnames